The 2002 Seattle Seahawks season was the franchise's 27th season in the National Football League (NFL), the first season in Qwest Field and the fourth under head coach Mike Holmgren.  The Seahawks returned to the NFC West for the first time since their inaugural season of 1976, as part of the realignment that occurred when the Houston Texans joined the NFL as the 32nd team. The Seahawks opened their new stadium, Seahawks Stadium, on the site of their former stadium, the Kingdome.

Offseason

2002 Expansion Draft

NFL draft

Undrafted free agents

Final roster

Season highlights
September 8: The Seahawks began their new life as an NFC team with an interconference run through their old division, the AFC West.  At Oakland Matt Hasselbeck threw for 155 yards and two touchdowns but Rich Gannon threw for 214 yards and two scores while he and four Raiders backs combined for 221 rushing yards and two touchdowns in a 31–17 Raiders win.
September 15: The Seahawks opened their new stadium by being outscored 14–3 in the fourth quarter, losing 24–13 to the Cardinals. Trent Dilfer started instead of Hasselback and threw for 352 yards but managed only one touchdown.
September 22: The Seahawks traveled to Giants Stadium and lost a 9–6 battle of field goals to the Giants.  The Hawks managed just 145 yards of offense.
September 29: The Seahawks finally got on the victory board by crushing the Vikings 48–23.  The two teams combined for 353 rushing yards and seven touchdowns, while the Seahawks won the turnover battle, forcing two fumbles while picking off Daunte Culpepper twice.
Monday Night Football, October 14: Trent Dilfer was picked off twice as Jeff Garcia managed two touchdowns in a 28–21 Niners win. Shaun Alexander rushed for 96 yards and a score.  Niners receiver Terrell Owens (six catches for 84 yards and two scores) autographed the ball in the endzone after one of his touchdowns and gave it to his agent, causing a stir.
October 20: The Seahawks traveled to St. Louis and fell to 1–5 after Marshall Faulk erupted to four touchdowns, three of them on the ground as the Rams won 37–20. Trent Dilfer was intercepted twice.
October 27: Against the Seahawks, Cowboys running back Emmitt Smith surpassed Walter Payton as the NFL's all-time leading rusher.  This game also marked the team's full-time switch at starting quarterback; starter Trent Dilfer was injured after compiling just 46 passing yards; backup Matt Hasselbeck replaced Dilfer and became starter the next week.

Schedule

Preseason

Source: Seahawks Media Guides

Regular season
Divisional matchups have the NFC West playing the NFC East and the AFC West.

Bold indicates division opponents.
Source: 2002 NFL season results

Standings

Game Summaries

Preseason

Week P1: vs. Indianapolis Colts

Week P2: at San Diego Chargers

Week P3: vs. Kansas City Chiefs

Week P4: at Denver Broncos

Regular season

Week 1: at Oakland Raiders

Week 2: vs. Arizona Cardinals

Week 3: at New York Giants

Week 4: vs. Minnesota Vikings

Week 6: vs. San Francisco 49ers

Week 7: at St. Louis Rams

Week 8: at Dallas Cowboys

Week 9: vs. Washington Redskins

Week 10: at Arizona Cardinals

Week 11: vs. Denver Broncos

Week 12: vs. Kansas City Chiefs

Week 13: at San Francisco 49ers

Week 14: vs. Philadelphia Eagles

Week 15: at Atlanta Falcons

Week 16: vs. St. Louis Rams

Week 17: at San Diego Chargers

References

External links
Seahawks draft history at NFL.com
2002 NFL season results at NFL.com

Seattle
Seattle Seahawks seasons
Seattle Seahawks